The Brink is an American comedy television series created by brothers Roberto Benabib and Kim Benabib. It focuses on a geopolitical crisis in Pakistan. Before cancellation, the show was conceived so that each season would follow a different crisis somewhere in the world involving the same main characters. The pilot episode was written by the Benabib brothers and directed by Jay Roach.

The series premiered on June 21, 2015 on the American cable television network HBO. The Brink was initially renewed for a second season while the first season was still airing. HBO later reversed its order and cancelled the series after just one season.

Cast

Main
 Jack Black as Alex Talbot, a lowly Foreign Service Officer assigned to the Embassy of the United States, Islamabad
 Tim Robbins as United States Secretary of State Walter Larson
 Pablo Schreiber as Lieutenant Commander Zeke "Z-Pak" Tilson, a drug-dealing United States Naval Aviator on the Gerald R. Ford-class aircraft carrier USS Ulysses S. Grant
 Aasif Mandvi as Rafiq Massoud, a Pakistani employed by the U.S. Embassy. 
 Maribeth Monroe as Kendra Peterson, Walter's assistant
 Eric Ladin as Lieutenant Glenn "Jammer" Taylor, Zeke's backseater
 Geoff Pierson as United States Secretary of Defense Pierce Gray
 Esai Morales as President of the United States Julian Navarro

Recurring
 Mimi Kennedy as CIA Director Susan Buckley
 Jaimie Alexander as Lieutenant Gail Sweet, a public affairs officer on the Grant whom Zeke has impregnated
 Melanie Chandra as Fareeda Massoud, Rafiq's younger sister
 Mary Faber as Ashley, Zeke's pharmacist ex-wife and drug supplier
 Meera Syal as Naeema, Rafiq's mother
 Joey Martin as Captain Stephens
 Carla Gugino as Joanne Larson, Walter's wife, United States Department of Defense general counsel and aspiring federal judge
 John Larroquette as Robert Kittredge, the evangelical United States Ambassador to Pakistan
 Rex Linn as Rear Admiral (upper half) McBride, commander of the Grant carrier battle group
 Iqbal Theba as General Umair Zaman, a Pakistani general who stages a military coup
 Rob Brydon as Martin
 Michelle Gomez as Vanessa
 Bernard White as General Haroon Raja,  Director General of Inter-Services Intelligence and Umair's half brother
 Iris Bahr as Israeli Foreign Minister Talia Levy

Episodes

Reception
The Brink received mixed reviews from critics. Rotten Tomatoes gave the first season a rating of 53%, based on 36 reviews, with an average rating of 5.7/10. The site's critical consensus reads, "The Brink avoids disaster thanks to the game efforts of a talented cast, but they - and viewers - deserve political satire with a sharper bite." Metacritic gives the first season a score of 52 out of 100, based on reviews from 30 critics, indicating "mixed or average reviews".

IGN reviewer Amber Dowling gave the entire first season an 8.0 out of 10 'Great' score, saying that "after a rough first couple of episodes the actors settled into their characters and viewers grew more comfortable with the tone. Quick and surprising plot twists coupled with strong on-screen pairings eventually resulted in a fun summer romp with plenty of potential."

International broadcast
In India, the series aired within 24 hours of the US premiere on June 22, 2015, on HBO Defined HD. In Australia, the series premiered on July 7, 2015, on Showcase.  In Saudi Arabia and the rest of the Middle East and North Africa, the series premiered on November 11, 2015, on Orbit Showtime Network (OSN).

References

External links
 
 

2010s American black comedy television series
2010s American political comedy television series
2010s American satirical television series
2015 American television series debuts
2015 American television series endings
English-language television shows
HBO original programming
Television shows set in Pakistan
Works about diplomats